Tour de France (called Pro Cycling Manager 2011 on PC) is a cycling game released in 2011. It is the second installment in the Tour de France series.

Features
The game has two modes: the player can either complete the full Tour de France course, or single stages. It also has all the official teams.

2011 video games
Cycling video games
PlayStation 3 games
Video games developed in France
Video games set in Belgium
Video games set in France
Xbox 360 games